The Red Road is an American drama television series that aired on SundanceTV from February 27, 2014 to May 7, 2015. This was SundanceTV's second fully owned scripted original series; the first was Rectify. The Red Road was canceled after its second season, as confirmed by Jason Momoa, who played Phillip Kopus in the series. The show's plot is based on the plight of the Ramapough Lenape Nation at the Ringwood Mines landfill site in New Jersey, where toxic wastes from the nearby Mahwah Ford plant were dumped.

Plot
Police Officer Harold Jensen is the main protagonist. He is trying to keep his family together after a cover-up involving his mentally unstable wife, a recovering alcoholic who self-medicates her undiagnosed schizophrenia with alcohol. Jensen comes into conflict with Phillip Kopus, a member of the Ramapough Mountain people. His state-recognized tribe lives in the Ramapo Mountains in a border area of New York and New Jersey in the fictitious small town of Walpole, New Jersey, across the Hudson River from New York City.

Production
The working title for the series was originally The Descendants. Production for both seasons were in Atlanta, Georgia, in 2013 and 2014.

Cast

Main cast
 Martin Henderson as Harold Jensen
 Jason Momoa as Phillip Kopus
 Julianne Nicholson as Jean Jensen
 Allie Gonino as Rachel Jensen
 Tamara Tunie as Marie Van Der Veen
 Kiowa Gordon as Junior Van Der Veen
 Annalise Basso as Kate Jensen

Recurring cast

Episodes

Series overview

Season 1 (2014)

Season 2 (2015)

Reception 
The Red Road has received mostly favorable reviews. Review aggregator site Metacritic has given the season a "generally favorable" score of 66 out of 100, based on 25 critics. On another review aggregator site, Rotten Tomatoes, it holds a 65% rating with an average rating of 6.9 out of 10, based on 26 reviews. The consensus reads, "The Red Road suffers from uneven writing, but its talented cast and creepy story hint at undeveloped promise."

Graphic novel
In 2015, Sundance released The Red Road 1990: A Graphic Novel to be read online.

See also
 The red road (definition)
Out of the Furnace

References

External links

2010s American drama television series
2014 American television series debuts
English-language television shows
Ramapough Mountain Indians
Sundance TV original programming
Television shows about Native Americans